José Sarrión Andaluz (born 1982 in Cartagena) is a Spanish politician, procurator in the Cortes of Castile and León and member of United Left.

Biography 

Born in Cartagena in 1982, Sarrión has a PhD in Philosophy and is Professor of Anthropology in the Pontifical University of Salamanca.

Sarrión has been a member of the United Left and the Communist Party of Salamanca since the 1990s. In 2015 he was elected as presidential candidate of the Junta of Castile and León in an open consultation, obtaining a seat of procurator in the Cortes of Castile and León in the regional elections of May.

In September 2016 he was elected General Coordinatorof United Left of Castile and León.

References 

1982 births
University of Salamanca alumni
People from Cartagena, Spain
United Left (Spain) politicians
Communist Party of Spain politicians
Living people